Mentadent is a brand name for a line of dental products manufactured by Unilever for its home and international markets excluding the United States and Canada where the company sold its rights to the brand to Church & Dwight Company in 2003.

In 2016, Church & Dwight announced it would discontinue the Mentadent brand effective Spring 2017. As it only involved the rights for US and Canadian sales, this did not affect Unilever which still markets and sells Mentadent branded products in other markets.

In 2018 Unilever quietly retired the Mentadent SR brand from the UK market, leaving only Mentadent P on sale. Mentadent P has since been discontinued along with the rest of the Mentadent Range from the UK market.

History 

Unilever first introduced the brand around 1982 with the launch of Mentadent P, Mentadent later became the key brand for Unilever toothpaste and Gibbs SR, a brand that dated back to the 1950s, was renamed Mentadent SR.

First UK television advert 
Mentadent SR, formerly Gibbs SR, is one of three toothpaste products still marketed by Unilever worldwide. The product was originally named after its active ingredient, sodium ricinoleate.

Gibbs SR was the first product to be promoted on UK television. The introduction of commercial television advertising was due to the Television Act of 1954 which created the commercial broadcaster ITV. The advertisement was first shown on Associated-Rediffusion in London on 22 September 1955 at 8.12pm BST, with a voiceover by Alex Macintosh. The advertisement was written and produced by Brian Palmer.

Toothpaste
Unilever makes 3 varieties of toothpaste under the Mentadent brand
Mentadent P Toothpaste
Mentadent Sensitive Toothpaste
Mentadent SR Toothpaste (Discontinued)

Post-2003 brand within the United States and Canada 
In 2003, Church & Dwight Company acquired the United States and Canadian rights to the Mentadent brand from Unilever and then operated it as a subsidiary brand of Arm & Hammer until it discontinued sales of the brand in 2016.

Mentadent is most notable for its unique toothpaste dispenser: a dual chamber pump.  This design is intended to keep two ingredients separated until they are dispensed.  Upon brushing, the ingredients will react with each other in the user's mouth. Both the toothpaste (formula) and the design of the pump were invented and then patented by Hans Schaeffer - who later sold the patent.

In the majority of its toothpaste lines, the two separate ingredients are baking soda and peroxide.  Upon brushing, baking soda and peroxide combine to release oxygen bubbles.  It is claimed that these bubbles will clean, whiten, and freshen the mouth.

Varieties

Mentadent Replenishing White
Mentadent Advanced Whitening
Mentadent Advanced Cleaning with Breath Freshening
Mentadent Advanced Care
Mentadent White System

See also

List of toothpaste brands
Index of oral health and dental articles

References 

Brands of toothpaste
Church & Dwight brands
Unilever brands